Originally mapped in Cecil County, Maryland in 1899, more than 10 million acres (40,000 km²) of the Cecil soil series (Fine, kaolinitic, thermic Typic Kanhapludults) are now mapped in the Piedmont region of the southeastern United States. It extends from Virginia through North Carolina (where it is the state soil), South Carolina, Georgia and Alabama, with the typic Cecil pedon actually located in Franklin County, NC. 

The Cecil series developed over igneous rock such as granite, and metamorphic rock which is chemically similar to granite. Virgin Cecil soils support forests dominated by pine, oak and hickory, and have a topsoil of brown sandy loam. The subsoil is a red clay which is dominated by kaolinite and has considerable mica. Few Cecil soils are in their virgin state, for most have been cultivated at one time or another. Indifferent land management has allowed many areas of Cecil soils to lose their topsoils through soil erosion, exposing the red clay subsoil. This clay is amenable to cultivation, responds well to careful management, and supports healthy growth of pine where allowed to revert to forest. Like other well-drained Ultisols, it is ideal for urban development; however, in common with other kaolinite-dominated clays, it has little ability to recover from soil compaction. Total potassium in the Cecil is higher than typical for Ultisols due to the presence of mica.

Official profile description

(Combined thickness of the Bt horizon is 24 to 50 inches)

The slight acidity of the Ap in this profile is atypical for Cecil series—moderate to very strong acidity is the rule—and is evidence that the soil was limed. The B and C horizons are strongly to very strongly acidic.

See also
Pedology (soil study)
List of U.S. state soils

References

External links
Official Series Description - Cecil Series
Cecil soil landscape near Columbus GA

Pedology
Soil in the United States
Geology of North Carolina
Geology of Virginia
Geology of South Carolina
Geology of Alabama
Geology of Georgia (U.S. state)
Symbols of North Carolina
Types of soil